Singh of Festival is a 2015 Sikh devotional film from Punjab. It stars Roshan Prince, Mahie Gill, Gurpreet Ghuggi, Dharmendra, Disha Parmar and Jaswinder Bhalla, with music composed and performed by Tru-Skool and Gupsy Aujla.

Cast
 Roshan Prince as Taru Singh
 Mahie Gill as Mata Gujri Kaur
 Gurpreet Ghuggi as Mani Singh
 Dharmendra as Bhai Dyala Singh
 Jaswinder Bhalla as Banda Singh Bahadur
 Wamiqa Gabbi as Mata Gujar Kaur
 B.N. Sharma as Jassa Singh Ahluwalia 
 Karamjit Anmol as Bhai Sati Das
 Kulwinder Billa (as himself) 
 Kamal Khan (as himself) 
 Geeta Zaildar (as himself) 
 Lehmber Hussainpuri (as himself)

Soundtrack

References

2015 films
Punjabi-language Indian films
2010s Punjabi-language films